Sultan Zainal Abidin III Muadzam Shah ibni Almarhum Sultan Ahmad Muadzam Shah II, (12 April 1866 – 26 November 1918) was Sultan and Yang di-Pertuan Besar of the state of Terengganu from 1881 to 1918. Succeeding on the death of his father Sultan Ahmad, under his reign Terengganu became a British protectorate under the Anglo-Siamese Treaty of 1909. In 1911, Sultan Zainal Abidin III issued Terengganu's first constitution. He died in Kuala Terengganu on 26 November 1918, aged 52, after a nearly 37-year reign and was buried in the Zainal Abidin mosque. He was succeeded by his son, Muhammad Shah II.

Honours

Foreign honours
  :
 Knight Grand Cordon of the Order of the White Elephant (April 1887)
 Knight Grand Cross of the Order of the Crown of Thailand (GCCT) (April 1896)
  : 
 Knight Commander of the Order of St Michael and St George (KCMG) – Sir (19 June 1911)

1866 births
1918 deaths
Sultans of Terengganu
Honorary Knights Commander of the Order of St Michael and St George
19th-century monarchs in Asia